Chrzanów  is a village in Janów Lubelski County, Lublin Voivodeship, in eastern Poland. It is the seat of the gmina (administrative district) called Gmina Chrzanów.

The village has a population of 1,760.

References

Villages in Janów Lubelski County
Lublin Governorate
Lublin Voivodeship (1919–1939)